The Fanellhorn is a mountain in the Lepontine Alps of Graubünden, Switzerland, south of Vals.

Its summit can be reached by hikers using a signposted path that comes from Guraletschsee and reaches the ridge "Fanellgrätli" on 2710 meters, leading to the peak from northeast
(Swiss grade T4, signposted blue and white from point 2710, before it is red and white and T2). This is a possible extension to a popular hike starting at Zervreila, that passes the three lakes Guraletschsee, Amperveilsee and Selvasee and descends via Selva Alp to Vals. Vals is famous for its spa.

In winter it is a popular summit for enthusiasts of Ski touring, of which most choose a northerly descend.

References

External links
 Fanellhorn on Hikr
 Fanellhorn on Summitpost

Mountains of the Alps
Alpine three-thousanders
Mountains of Switzerland
Mountains of Graubünden
Lepontine Alps
Vals, Switzerland